The Marion County Herald & Jefferson Jimplecute (formerly Marion County Herald) is a weekly community newspaper in Jefferson, Texas. It was founded by employees of another newspaper, the Jefferson Jimplecute, who left in a dispute over pay. The first issue came out on June 19, 2015. The paper was distributed free of charge initially but restricted to paying readers starting with the third edition. The paper stopped printed versions in October 2015, moving to an online only format. The paper's focus is on local news in Marion County, Texas.

On August 21, 2020, it was announced that V. Hugh Lewis, publisher of the Marion County Herald, and Austin Lewter, a community newspaper publisher, purchased the Jefferson Jimplecute from Strube-Palmer Media. Lewis and Lewter, both having been editors of the Jimplecute at varying times in its past, partnered to acquire the publication and now operate it as co-publishers. Since the acquisition, the Jimplecute appears to have been subsumed into the Marion County Herald as the Herald's name has been updated on the paper's website to read, Marion County Herald & Jefferson Jimplecute.

The paper is located at 115 N. Polk ST., Jefferson, TX 75657 and can be reached via phone at 903-665-2462 or via their website http://www.marioncoherald.com.

References

Weekly newspapers published in Texas